The cabinet of Harri Holkeri was the 64th government of Finland, which existed from 30 April 1987 to 26 April 1991. It was a majority government formed by the National Coalition Party, the Social Democratic Party, the Swedish People's Party, and the Rural Party. The cabinet's Prime Minister was Harri Holkeri. The Rural Party left the coalition in August 1990 because it disagreed with the government's pension funding plan.

Ministers

References

Holkeri
1987 establishments in Finland
1991 disestablishments in Finland
Cabinets established in 1987
Cabinets disestablished in 1991